Pillars of Truth (BK or BTK) was a political party in Kiribati, until 2020 when it merged with the Kiribati First Party to create the Boutokaan Kiribati Moa Party. 
 
The party was created through a split in the National Progressive Party, which was the first party to rule after Independence in 1979.

In the 2003 presidential elections, its candidate Anote Tong won 47.4% and was elected president. In the legislative elections of two months earlier, the party won 16 of 41 elected seats.

In 22 August and 30 August 2007 House of Assembly of Kiribati elections, the party won 18 seats. On 17 October 2007, Anote Tong was re-elected as president by a large majority. The opposition boycotted the election due to the exclusion of two opposition candidates, including Tong's brother Harry. In 2016, Taneti Mamau of Tobwaan Kiribati Party took his place as president.

Cabinet members
Below is the list of cabinet members of the Republic of Kiribati for 2007 to 2011 for the Pillars of Truth:

Hon Anote Tong- President of the Republic of Kiribati and Minister of Foreign Affairs & Immigration
Hon Teima Onorio – Vice President and Minister of Commerce, Industry and Cooperatives
Hon Amberoti Nikora – Minister of Internal and Social Affairs 
Hon Iotebwa Redfern – Minister of Labour and Human Resources Development
Hon Tetabo Nakara – Minister of Environment, Lands and Agriculture Development
Hon James Taom – Minister of Education 
Hon Natan Teewe – Minister of Finance and Economic Development
Hon Tawita Temoku – Minister of Line and Phoenix Islands Development
Hon Taberannang Timeon – Minister of Fisheries and Marine Resources Development 
Hon Dr. Kautu Tenaua – Minister of Health and Medical Services
Hon Kouraiti Beniato – Minister of Public Works and Utilities
Hon Temate Ereateiti – Minister of Communications Transport and Tourism Development

References

Political parties in Kiribati
Political parties established in 2001
Political parties disestablished in 2020